Labib, was the official mascot of the environment in Tunisia from 1992 until 13 April 2012, when the Minister of the Environment, Mémia El Benna, announced the end of its use.

Origin 

The decision to create a mascot for the environment was taken in 1992 by the Minister of the Environment Mohamed Mehdi Mlika as part of a program of education, information and awareness on environmental protection. It was designed by Chedly Belkhamsa.

The mascot is in the form of a fennec fox (Vulpes zerda), an animal found in southern Tunisia.

Statues of Labib were erected in each town, especially on streets named 'Boulevard of the Environment'. It was also used in several awareness campaigns in schools, on television, and on the radio.

Controversy 

During the post-revolution Jebali government, Mémia El Benna made the decision to end the use of the official mascot, saying it was too closely tied to the former regime of Zine El Abidine Ben Ali.

On 8 May 2015, the Minister of the Environment Nejib Derouiche announced that a new mascot will replace Labib.

In popular culture 

Labib was the subject of a song by the group ZeMeKeN "Ena Esmi Labib" ("My name is Labib").

References 

Fictional foxes
Canine mascots
Environment of Tunisia